The Sylvania Awards were given by the television manufacturer Sylvania Electric Products for various categories of television performance, broadcasting, scripts, music and other aspects of production between 1951 and 1959. In their day they rivaled the Emmy Award for prestige. They came to an end after the sponsor was merged into GTE.

History

Sylvania Electric Products, a television set manufacturer, gave the annual Sylvania Awards from 1951.
The awards were given for advancing creative television techniques.
The Sylvania Award was as prestigious as the Emmy Award in the early days of television.
It was one of several developed in the 1950s after the Emmy award was founded in 1949.
Others included the TV Guide Award and the Look Magazine TV Award.
Ed Sullivan gave out the Michael award in Los Angeles from 1950 to 1953.

In 1951 the Sylvania award for best program suitable for children was given to Zoo Parade by the National Congress of Parents and Teachers, headed by Mrs. Johnny Hays.
The awards for 1953 were presented in New York on 1 December 1953, with winners announced in advance. 
No grand award was presented. Winners included  Rod Steiger (actor) and Paddy Chayefsky (script) for  Marty, Donald O'Connor, Danny Thomas and Mary Martin.
The 1955 awards were presented by broadcaster Deems Taylor on 29 November 1955.
Sylvester L. Weaver Jr., head of NBC, received an award.

1957 Sylvania Television Award winners included Mary Martin, Dinah Shore, Marian Anderson, Steve Allen and Jack Paar.
The 1958 awards were presented in January 1959 at a ceremony in the Grand Ballroom of the Plaza Hotel in Manhattan attended by about 400 guests including performers and representatives of networks, TV stations and production companies. Comedian Orson Bean was the master of ceremonies. 
The awards were presented by Don G. Mitchell, chairman and president of Sylvania Electric Products.
In 1959 Sylvania Electric Products merged with General Telephone to form General Telephone and Electronics (GTE).
The awards for 1959 were the last.

Trophy
The award winners received a trophy in the form of a clock.
A walnut wood base is decorated by a high-relief sculpture of a woman in a robe who carries the clock face on her shoulders.
The face is made of glass, with etched gilt stars at each hour and stylized metal lightning bolts for hands.
Some versions of the award were functioning electric clocks made by Jefferson Electric Company of Bellwood, Illinois.
In others the clock hands were permanently attached to the glass face.

Awards
Complete listings of award winners are set forth at:
 1951 Sylvania Television Awards
 1952 Sylvania Television Awards
 1953 Sylvania Television Awards
 1954 Sylvania Television Awards
 1955 Sylvania Television Awards
 1956 Sylvania Television Awards
 1957 Sylvania Television Awards
 1958 Sylvania Television Awards
 1959 Sylvania Television Awards

Notes

Sources

 

1951 establishments in the United States
1959 disestablishments in the United States
American television awards
Awards established in 1951